The Vyazma is a river in the Smolensk Oblast in Russia. It is a left tributary of the Dnieper. The length of the river is 147 km. The area of its basin is 1350 km². In ancient times, the Vyazma River was a part of a route that connected the upper basins of the Volga, Oka, and Dnieper with the help of portages. The city of Vyazma is located on the Vyazma River.

References

Rivers of Smolensk Oblast